Windhill is a hamlet in Ross and Cromarty, in the Highland council area of Scotland, about halfway between the villages of Beauly and Muir of Ord, beside the A862. It is just to the north of a small stream which marks the boundary of Ross and Cromarty with Inverness-shire, which is also often considered to be the western boundary of the Black Isle.

There are several standing stones near Windhill. One of them, known as Clach an t-Seasaidh, is said to be referred to in a prophecy by the Brahan Seer.

References

Populated places in Ross and Cromarty